Kanavu is an alternative school/commune in Cheengode in  Nadavayal village, Wayanad district, Kerala, India, set up by writer, activist and film director K. J. Baby. The school's activities include performances of traditional plays  and music, as well as martial arts (Kalarippayattu) training.  During the year 2007 the Kanavu was registered with the students of kanavu as a trust, and they have taken over the charges.

See also
Palayathu Vayal Govt. UP School

External links 
 https://www.imdb.com/title/tt17501232/ Kanavu - The Dream (2021) - Documentary Short
 http://www.tehelka.com/story_main38.asp?filename=cr220308masti_ki.asp Masti ki Pathshala
 http://www.international.ucla.edu/showevent.asp?eventid=3843
 "Kanavu - where learning happens" by Alex M George in Economic and Political Weekly
Lights, action, camera about the making of the film Guda
17. K.J. Baby, Kanavu, Nadavayal, Wayanad read the section 17. talks about the film made by Kanavu
Kanavu malayileykku about film  
  elements@dataone.in
docu film on kanavu
work and wisdom of vernacular educators from India Interviews with Baby&Shirly by gautam sarang 
 Category: Documentary by C. Saratchandran
Culture of Kerala